Şehzade Halil (probably 1346–1362) was an Ottoman prince. His father was Orhan, the second bey of the Ottoman beylik (later empire). His mother was Theodora Kantakouzene, the daughter of Byzantine emperor John VI Kantakouzenos and Irene Asanina. His kidnapping was an important event in 14th century Ottoman-Byzantine relations. He was killed by his brother Murad I.

Kidnapping 
In the mid-14th century, piracy along the Aegean Sea and the Marmara Sea coasts was widespread. The pirates usually kidnapped people for ransom. In 1357 they kidnapped Halil near İzmit (ancient Nikomedia) on the Marmara coast. It is not known whether they knew the identity of their prey beforehand, but upon learning it, they escaped to Phocaea (modern Foça) on the Aegean coast. Phocaea was a Byzantine fort recently captured from Republic of Genoa and commanded by Leo Kalothetos. Orhan appealed to the Byzantine emperor Andronikos IV Palaiologos to rescue his son. He offered to cancel Byzantine debts and promised not to support the Kantakouzenos family's claims on the Byzantine throne. Andronikos agreed and tried to rescue Halil, but Leo was reluctant and in 1358 Andronikos had to lay siege to Phocaea with a small fleet of three vessels (the expenses of which were paid by Orhan). He also called Ilyas Bey, the ruler of Saruhan (a small Turkmen beylik in west Anatolia formed after the disintegration of the Sultanate of Rum), for a joint operation against Phocaea. However Ilyas was playing both sides and planning to kidnap Andronikos during a hunting party. Nevertheless Andronikos was able to forestall his plans by arresting him. Without Saruhan collaboration, he lifted the siege. After the failure of the 1358 operations, Orhan came to Scutari (modern Üsküdar) on the Asiatic shore of the Bosporus for talks and agreed to pay 30,000 ducats as a ransom. In 1359, Halil was released.

Aftermath 
As a part of the agreement, Halil was engaged to his first cousin, Irene Palaiologina, the 10-year-old daughter of John V Palaiologos. The Ottoman prince and Byzantine princess later married and had two sons. Since Halil's elder brother Şehzade Süleyman had already died, the Palaiologos family hoped to see him as the new ruler of the Ottoman beylik. But to their dismay, after Orhan’s death, Halil's brother Murad I was enthroned as the new bey. Although Halil tried to fight for the throne, he was executed in 1362 by his brother.

Issue 
Gündüz Bey (born in 1361)
Ömer Bey (born in 1362)

See also
List of kidnappings

References 

1350s in the Byzantine Empire
1350s in the Ottoman Empire
1357
14th century in international relations
Kidnappings
Medieval crime
People captured by pirates
Sons of emperors